Cotswold Hills is a rural-residential locality within Toowoomba in the Toowoomba Region, Queensland, Australia.

Geography
It is a rural-residential area with homes on small acreages.

It is bounded to the north by Holmes Road, to the east by Boundary Street, to the south by Bridge Street and the Toowoomba Connection Road, and to the west (partly) by Gowrie Junction Road.by Holmes Road 

The Toowoomba Second Range Crossing (Warrego Highway) passes through the north-western corner of the locality with no intersections within the locality.

History 
Cotswold Hills was in the Shire of Jondaryan until the amalgamation in 2008 that created the Toowoomba Region.

Education 
There are no schools in Cotswold Hills. The nearest government primary schools are Fairview Heights State School in neighbouring Wilsonton to the south-east and Gowrie State School in neighbouring Gowrie Junction to the north. The nearest government secondary school is Wilsonton State High School in Wilsonton Heights to the south-east.

Amenities 
John Trousdell Park is  recreation area in Hamzah Drive. It has a children's playground, barbeque and picnic facilities, and a court for basketball and tennis. It has a bushland trail for walkers and cyclists. It is managed by the Toowoomba Regional Council.

References

External links

 

Suburbs of Toowoomba
Localities in Queensland